Bajhang District, a part of Sudurpashchim Province, is one of the seventy-seven districts of Nepal. The headquarter Chainpur is situated at the bank of Seti River and Bauli Khola. Bitthad Bazar is bordered with Baitadi District which is the place of Bitthad Kalika and Kedar. This place was famous for fresh milk and yogurt.

Geography and climate
The district is surrounded by Bajura and Humla in the East, Baitadi and Darchula in the West, Humla in the North and Doti and Achham in the South. The district is located between 29°29' and 30°09' north longitude, and 80°46' and 81°34 east latitude.

Major religious spots
 Khaptad Baba Mandir
 Devisthan Mandir, Chainpur (HQ of Bajhang District)
 Chuli Tika, Chabbis
 Ram mandir, Kada
 Surma Sarowar, Surma
 Khulmour Kedar Mandir (kedarnath)
 Thali, Durga thali Municipality
 Baddi jyaban, Bungle Municipality

Demographics
At the time of the 2011 Nepal census, Bajhang District had a population of 195,159. Of these, 75.5% spoke Nepali, 23.6% Bajhangi, 0.5% Doteli, 0.2% Dhuleli, 0.1% Gurung, 0.1% Tamang and 0.1% other languages as their first language.

In terms of ethnicity/caste, 66.6% were Chhetri, 10.2% Hill Brahmin, 7.3% Kami, 5.1% other Dalit, 4.9% Thakuri, 2.2% Sarki, 1.5% Damai/Dholi, 1.2% Sanyasi/Dasnami, 0.2% Badi, 0.1% Gurung, 0.1% Magar, 0.1% Newar, 0.1% Tamang, 0.1% other Terai and 0.1% others.

In terms of religion, 99.7% were Hindu and 0.2% Buddhist.

In terms of literacy, 55.4% could read and write, 3.2% could only read and 41.3% could neither read nor write.

Administration
The district consists of twelve municipalities, out of which two are urban municipalities and ten are rural municipalities. These are as follows:
 Jaya Prithvi Municipality
 Bungal Municipality
 Talkot Rural Municipality
 Masta Rural Municipality
 Khaptadchhanna Rural Municipality
 Thalara Rural Municipality
 Bitthadchir Rural Municipality
 Surma Rural Municipality
 Chhabis Pathibhera Rural Municipality
 Durgathali Rural Municipality
 Kedarsyu Rural Municipality
 Saipal Rural Municipality

Prior to the restructuring of the district, Bajhang District consisted of the following municipalities and Village development committees:

Banjh
Bagthala
Bhairabnath
Bhamchaur
Bhatekhola
Byasi
Chaudhari
Dahabagar
Dangaji
Dantola
Daulichaur
Deulekh
Deulikot
Dhamena
Gadaraya
Jaya Prithvi Municipality
Kadal
Kailash
Kalukheti
Kanda
Kaphalaseri
Khiratadi
Koiralakot
Kot Bhairab
Kotdewal
Lamatola
Lekhgaun
Majhigaun
Malumela
Mashdev
Matela
Maulali
Melbisauni
Parakatne
Patadewal
Pauwagadhi
Pitatola
Pipalkot
Rayal
Rilu
Sainpasela
Sunikot
Sunkuda
Surma
Syandi
Thalara

References

 
Districts of Nepal established in 1962